Masterpiss of Pain is the debut studio album of the Norwegian black metal band Khold. It was recorded in the early part of 2001 and released in December of that year, through Moonfog Productions, the record label run by Satyricon leader Sigurd Wongraven (Satyr).

Track listing

Personnel

Khold 

 Sverre "Gard" Stokland – vocals, guitar
 Geir "Rinn" Kildahl – guitar
 Lars Eikind – bass guitar
 Thomas "Sarke" Berglie – drums, percussion

Additional personnel 

 Galder – guitar on "Rovnatt"

References 

Khold albums
2001 debut albums